Rekowo  is a village in the administrative district of Gmina Kobylanka, within Stargard County, West Pomeranian Voivodeship, in north-western Poland.

For the history of the region, see History of Pomerania.

The village has a population of 47.

References

Rekowo